Nashville Rebel is Waylon Jennings' third album for RCA Victor. It reached #4 on the Billboard country albums chart.

Background
After recording two albums for RCA Victor, Jennings was cast in the Jay Sheridan film Nashville Rebel.  In the authorized video documentary Renegade Outlaw Legend, Jennings recalled, "I went and auditioned for that and I thought I was terrible.  But I was the one they wanted...I don't know how in the world I did it 'cause I was  out of it [on pills] most of the time."  The album includes a cover of The Beatles' "Norwegian Wood" from Rubber Soul (1965), although it was not featured in the movie.  Jennings later recalled, "Chet [Atkins, Jennings' record producer] came up with the left-field idea of doing a version of The Beatles' 'Norwegian Wood.'  It was this kind of unpredictability that endeared Chet to me.  He loved those Beatles tunes, and I did too." It also features several songs written by Harlan Howard, and Jennings would record a full album of Howard's songs on his next LP.  The Howard-written "Green River" was released as a single and peaked at #11 on the charts.  When the album was released, it was listed as "Reprocessed Stereo" (an electronic technique applied to monophonic recordings in order to create a simulated "stereophonic" effect) although all of the songs on side one are indeed true stereo.  "Norwegian Wood" wasn't issued in true stereo until 1999, but the five movie instrumental tracks (tracks 8-12) have never been available in true stereo anywhere. Tom Jurek of AllMusic writes: "While the title of the album may be prophetic in terms of the radical changes in Waylon Jennings' career around 1971, the music found here is anything but. While Jennings brought seven of the 12 songs to these sessions, and starred in the film, the soundtrack feels and sounds dated and overwrought - mostly from a production point of view."

Shooter Jennings performed, in portrayal of his father, "I'm a Long Way from Home" for the soundtrack to the Johnny Cash biopic Walk the Line in 2005.

Track listing
"Silver Ribbons" (Jim Robinson, Johnny Wilson, Vern Meroney) – 2:26
"Nashville Bum" (Waylon Jennings, Glenn Corbin, Frankie Miller) – 1:56
"Green River" (Harlan Howard) – 2:32
"Nashville Rebel" (Howard) – 1:54
"I'm a Long Way from Home" (Hank Cochran) – 3:31
"Tennessee" (Howard) – 2:14
"Norwegian Wood (This Bird Has Flown)" (John Lennon, Paul McCartney) – 2:04
"Hoodlum" (Jay Sheridan) – 2:57
"Spanish Penthouse" (Sheridan) – 2:44
"Lang's Theme" (Sheridan) – 1:31
"Rush Street Blues" (Sheridan) – 2:20 
"Lang's Mansion" (Sheridan) – 2:55

Personnel
Waylon Jennings - guitar, vocals
Chip Young, Fred Carter Jr., Jerry Reed, Shirl Milete, Velma Smith - guitar
Charlie McCoy, Jerry Gropp - guitar, harmonica
Junior Huskey, Norbert Putnam - bass guitar
Weldon Myrick - steel guitar
Hargus Robbins - piano
Jerry Carrigan, Richie Albright - drums
Chet Atkins - arrangements

References

External links
Waylon Jennings' Official Website

Waylon Jennings albums
Albums produced by Chet Atkins
1966 soundtrack albums
RCA Victor soundtracks
Film soundtracks